Halina Aszkiełowicz-Wojno (4 February 1947 – 22 June 2018) was a Polish volleyball player, a member of Poland women's national volleyball team in 1965–1973, a bronze medalist of the Olympic Games Mexico 1968, medalist of the European Championship (silver in 1967, bronze in 1971).

References

1947 births
2018 deaths
Sportspeople from Słupsk
Polish women's volleyball players
Volleyball players at the 1968 Summer Olympics
Olympic medalists in volleyball
Olympic volleyball players of Poland
Medalists at the 1968 Summer Olympics
Olympic bronze medalists for Poland